Bernhard Lewkovitch (born 28 May 1927) is a Danish composer, educated at the musical conservatories at Paris and København. He has worked as an organist and cantor at the Catholic St. Ansgar's Cathedral in Copenhagen. Lewkovitch is most widely recognized for his traditional catholic influenced choir music.

Works 
His works include various pieces for instrumental ensembles, along with numerous compositions for mixed choir, e.g. Five Danish madrigals (op. 12) and Three Italian madrigals (op. 13), the latter set to poems by Torquato Tasso. Lewkovitch's style moved from modality to serialism in the 1950s, and he has also worked with avant-garde techniques.

Key works include Tre Madrigali di Torquato Tasso (1955, Choir), Improperia (1961, Choir), and Songs of Solomon (1985, Tenor, Clarinet, Contrabassoon And Horn).

Achievements 

 1949, Graduated as an organist from the Royal Danish Academy of Music 
 1963, Awarded the Carl Nielsen And Anne Marie Carl Nielsen grant 
 1972, Awarded an honorable diploma from the town of Assisi
 1997, Awarded the Carl Nielsen And Anne Marie Carl Nielsen grant a second time

References

External links 
 Conversation with Lewkovitch at his turning seventy-five

1927 births
Possibly living people
20th-century Danish composers
20th-century Danish male musicians
21st-century composers
21st-century organists
21st-century male musicians
Danish classical organists
Danish Roman Catholics
Danish people of Jewish descent
Danish people of Ukrainian descent
Male composers
Male classical organists
People from Copenhagen
People of Ukrainian-Jewish descent